Amblyomma rhinocerotis is a species of tick belonging to the family Ixodidae. This species occurs in Africa. It is a primarily rhino parasite.

Bibliography
George Henry Falkiner Nuttall,William Francis Cooper,Cecil Warburton,Louis Edward Robinson  - Ticks, a Monograph of the Ixodoidea,: Bibliography of the ixodoidea, Vol. 1-2
 Omobolanle Kushimo The Tick Genus Amblyomma in Africa: Phylogenyand Mutilocus DNA Barcoding

References

External links

 Forestry Images

Amblyomma
Animals described in 1778